The 2017–18 Kentucky Wildcats women's basketball team represents the University of Kentucky in the 2017–18 NCAA Division I women's basketball season. The team plays its home games in Lexington, Kentucky at Memorial Coliseum with three games at Rupp Arena. The team is led by Matthew Mitchell in his eleventh season as head coach. They are a member of the Southeastern Conference. They finished the season 15–17, 6–10 in SEC play to finish in ninth place. They advanced to the quarterfinals of the SEC women's tournament where they lost to Mississippi State. They missed the postseason for the first time since 2004.

Previous season 
The Wildcats finished the season 22–11, 11–5 in SEC play to finish in a tie for third place. They advanced to the semifinals of the SEC women's tournament where they lost to South Carolina. They received an at-large to the NCAA women's tournament where they defeated Belmont in the first round before losing to Ohio State in the second round.

Offseason

Departures

Newcomers

Roster

Schedule 

|-
!colspan=9 style="background:#273BE2; color:white;"| Exhibition

|-
!colspan=9 style="background:#273BE2; color:white;"| Non-conference regular season

|-
!colspan=9 style="background:#273BE2; color:white;"| SEC regular season

|-
!colspan=9 style="background:#273BE2; color:white;"| SEC Women's Tournament

Rankings 

^Coaches' Poll did not release a second poll at the same time as the AP.

See also 
 2017–18 Kentucky Wildcats men's basketball team

References 



Kentucky
Kentucky Wild
Kentucky Wildcats women's basketball seasons
University of Kentucky
Kentucky Wild